Jeffrey P. Yaroch is a Republican member of the Michigan House of Representatives.

Before being elected to the state legislature, Yaroch served as a firefighter and paramedic with the Clinton Township Fire Department. Yaroch also served on the Richmond City Council from November 1999 to December 2016.

References

External links 
 Jeff Yaroch at gophouse.org
 Jeff Yaroch at ballotpedia.org
 Jeff Yaroch at votesmart.org

Living people
Macomb Community College alumni
Western Michigan University Cooley Law School alumni
People from Macomb County, Michigan
Michigan city council members
Republican Party members of the Michigan House of Representatives
American firefighters
21st-century American politicians
Year of birth missing (living people)